Kawamata Tsunemasa (birth and death dates unknown) was a Japanese ukiyo-e artist of the Kawamata school of art,  active from the Genbun (1736–41) to perhaps the Meiwa (1764–72) eras.  He was a disciple of the school's founder, Kawamata Tsuneyuki.

Something more than fifty paintings identified as his survive. Like many early ukiyo-e artists, Tsunemasa and the Kawamata school specialized in painting (nikuhitsu-ga) rather than designing woodblock prints.  He worked primarily on bijin-ga portraits of female beauties.  His later painters appear to bear the influence of Suzuki Harunobu in the style in which he depicts women.  He produced many mitate-e works that allude to classical themes.

Tsunemasa's death date is unknown.  A Kawamata Tsunetatsu (川又 常辰), of whom little is known, produced works in Tsunemasa's style during Tsunemasa's late period, and thus is presumed to have been a successor.

References

Works cited

External links
 
 Kawamata Tsunemasa at ukiyo-e.org

Ukiyo-e artists